Monterey County, officially the County of Monterey, is a county located on the Pacific coast in the U.S. state of California. As of the 2020 census, its population was 439,035. The county's largest city and county seat is Salinas.

Monterey County comprises the Salinas, California, Metropolitan Statistical Area. It borders on the southern part of Monterey Bay, after which it is named. (The northern half of the bay is in Santa Cruz County.) Monterey County is a member of the regional governmental agency: the Association of Monterey Bay Area Governments.

Scenic features along the coastline - including Carmel-by-the-Sea, Big Sur, State Route 1, and the 17 Mile Drive on the Monterey Peninsula - have made the county famous around the world. Back when California was under Spanish and Mexican rule, the city of Monterey was its capital. Today, the economy of the county is mostly based on tourism in its coastal regions, and on agriculture in the region of the Salinas River valley. Most of the county's inhabitants live near the northern coast or in Salinas Valley; the southern coast and inland mountainous regions are sparsely populated.

History

Monterey County was one of the original counties of California, created in 1850 at the time of statehood.  Parts of the county were given to San Benito County in 1874.  The area was originally populated by Ohlone, Salinan and the Esselen tribes.

The county derives its name from Monterey Bay. The bay was named by Sebastián Vizcaíno in 1602 in honor of the Conde de Monterrey (or Count of Monterrey), then the Viceroy of New Spain. Monterrey is a variation of Monterrei, a municipality in the Galicia region of Spain where the Conde de Monterrey and his father (the Fourth Count of Monterrei) were from.

Geography
The county is roughly 1.5 times larger than the state of Delaware, and roughly similar in population and the size to Santa Barbara County.

Adjacent counties

Santa Cruz County to the north, San Benito County, Fresno County, and Kings County to the east as well as San Luis Obispo County to the south.

National protected areas
 Los Padres National Forest (part)
 Pinnacles National Park (part)
 Salinas River National Wildlife Refuge
 Ventana Wilderness (part)

In October 2019, the Bureau of Land Management ended a five-year moratorium on leasing federal land in California to fossil fuel companies, opening 725,000 acres (1100 sq. miles; 29,000 ha) to drilling in San Benito, Monterey, and Fresno counties.

Marine protected areas

Soquel Canyon State Marine Conservation Area
Elkhorn Slough State Marine Reserve
Elkhorn Slough State Marine Conservation Area
Moro Cojo Slough State Marine Reserve
Portuguese Ledge State Marine Conservation Area
Pacific Grove Marine Gardens State Marine Conservation Area
Lovers Point State Marine Reserve
Edward F. Ricketts State Marine Conservation Area
Asilomar State Marine Reserve

Flora and fauna
Monterey County has habitat to support the following endangered species:

 Hickman's potentilla
 Santa Cruz Long-toed Salamander
 Santa Cruz Tarweed
 Southern Steelhead Trout
 Yadon's piperia

Demographics

2020 census

Note: the US Census treats Hispanic/Latino as an ethnic category. This table excludes Latinos from the racial categories and assigns them to a separate category. Hispanics/Latinos can be of any race.

Income, education and poverty 2013 

Generally, the western/southern parts of the Monterey Peninsula, Carmel Valley, Creekbridge (Salinas), and eastern parts of Prundale were the county's most affluent and educated (see dark blue on map). These areas had a median household income significantly above that of the California or the U.S. overall (typically above $95,000 vs. $60,000 for California and $52,000 for the U.S.) and comprised roughly 8%-10% of neighborhoods (as defined by Census Block Groups). Educational attainment was at least on part with, or above, state and national levels, in these areas while the percentage of people living in poverty was typically a third or less than national and statewide average (with the exception of South Salinas).

Social deprivation (poverty and low levels of educational attainment) was concentrated in the central and eastern parts of Salinas, and central areas of Monterey, Seaside, Marina, Soledad and King City. In central and eastern Salinas up to 46% of individuals lived below the poverty line and those without a secondary educations formed a plurality or majority of residents. Overall, the Salinas metropolitan area, defined as coterminous with Monterey County, was among the least educated urban areas in the nation.

Most affluent neighborhoods
Roughly 8% of neighborhoods, as defined by Census Block Groups, had a median household income above $100,000 per year, about 60% above the national median. This coincided with the top 20 census block groups in the county listed below.

Most affluent neighborhoods (Median Household Income above $100k/yr.)

* Asterisk denotes a hypothetical rank among Monterey County's 226 Census Block Groups (e.g. if the U.S. overall was a Census Block Group in Monterey County, it would be the 141st most affluent of 226).

Least affluent neighborhoods
About 4.5% of neighborhoods, as defined by Census Block Groups, had a median household income below $30,000 per year, about 60% below the national median. This coincided with the 10 poorest of the 20 lowest income neighborhoods listed in the table below.

Least affluent neighborhoods (Median Household Income of $34.1k or less)

* Asterisk denotes a hypothetical rank among Monterey County's 226 Census Block Groups (e.g. if the U.S. overall was a Census Block Group in Monterey County, it would be the 86th poorest of 226).

2011

Places by population, race, and income

2010
The 2010 United States Census reported that Monterey County had a population of 415,057. The racial makeup of Monterey County was 230,717 (55.6%) White, 12,785 (3.1%) African American, 5,464 (1.3%) Native American, 25,258 (6.1%) Asian (2.8% Filipino, 0.7% Korean, 0.6% Chinese, 0.6% Japanese, 0.4% Vietnamese, 0.4% Indian), 2,071 (0.5%) Pacific Islander, 117,405 (28.3%) from other races, and 21,357 (5.1%) from two or more races. Hispanic or Latino of any race were 230,003 persons (55.4%); 50.2% of Monterey County is Mexican, 0.8% Salvadoran, and 0.5% Puerto Rican.

2000

As of the census of 2000, there were 401,762 people, 121,236 households, and 87,896 families residing in the county.  The population density was 121 people per square mile (47/km2).  There were 131,708 housing units at an average density of 40 per square mile (15/km2).  The racial makeup of the county was 55.9% White, 3.8% Black or African American, 1.1% Native American, 6.0% Asian, 0.5% Pacific Islander, 27.8% from other races, and 5.0% from two or more races.  46.79% of the population were Hispanic or Latino of any race. 6.3% were of German and 5.4% English ancestry according to Census 2000. 52.9% spoke English, 39.6% Spanish and 1.6% Tagalog as their first language.

There were 121,236 households, out of which 39.1% had children under the age of 18 living with them, 56.0% were married couples living together, 11.6% had a female householder with no husband present, and 27.5% were non-families. 21.2% of all households were made up of individuals, and 8.2% had someone living alone who was 65 years of age or older.  The average household size was 3.14 and the average family size was 3.65.

In the county, the population was spread out, with 28.4% under the age of 18, 10.9% from 18 to 24, 31.4% from 25 to 44, 19.3% from 45 to 64, and 10.0% who were 65 years of age or older.  The median age was 32 years. For every 100 female residents there were 107.3 male residents.  For every 100 female residents age 18 and over, there were 107.7 male residents.

The median income for a household in the county was $48,305, and the median income for a family was $51,169. Men had a median income of $38,444 versus $30,036 for the women. The per capita income for the county was $20,165.  About 9.7% of families and 13.5% of the population were below the poverty line, including 17.4% of those under age 18 and 6.8% of those age 65 or over.

Government
At the local level, Monterey County is governed by the Monterey County Board of Supervisors. Like all governing bodies in California, the Monterey County Board of Supervisors is empowered with both legislative and executive authority over the entirety of Monterey County and is the primary governing body for all unincorporated areas within the County boundaries. The Board has five elected members, each of whom represents one of five districts. Taken together, the five districts comprise the entirety of the county.

Current board members:
 Luis Alejo - 1st District
 Glenn Church - 2nd District
 Chris Lopez - 3rd District
 Wendy Root Askew - 4th District
 Mary Adams - 5th District

The Board conducts its meetings in the county seat, Salinas, and is a member of the regional governmental agency, the Association of Monterey Bay Area Governments.

Supervisorial Districts
Supervisorial district boundaries are divided roughly equally according to population, using data from the most recent census. In addition, any redistricting changes should approximately comply with both California law as well as the federal Voting Rights Act. Boundaries are adjusted decennially based on data reported by the United States Census Bureau for the most recent census. The next supervisorial election will be held on March 8, 2022.

District 1
The 1st District is geographically the smallest supervisorial district in Monterey County and is entirely within the city limits of the city of Salinas.

Luis Alejo represents the 1st District on the Board of Supervisors. His current term expires in December 2020.

District 2
As the northernmost supervisorial district in Monterey County, the 2nd District includes the communities of Boronda, Castroville, Las Lomas, Moss Landing, Pajaro, Prunedale, Royal Oaks, the northern neighborhoods of the city of Salinas, and those portions of the community of Aromas that are located within Monterey County.

John Phillips is currently the Supervisor for the 2nd District. His current term expires in December 2022.

District 3
The 3rd District covers the majority of the Salinas Valley and southern Monterey County, extending to its border with San Luis Obispo County. The district includes the unincorporated communities of Spreckels, Chualar, and Jolon; the eastern portion of the city of Salinas; the cities of Gonzales, Greenfield, Soledad, and King City; the military installations at Fort Hunter Liggett and Camp Roberts; and portions of the Los Padres National Forest.

The 3rd District is represented by Chris Lopez. His current term expires in December 2022.

District 4
The 4th District includes the southwest portion of the city of Salinas, the cities of Del Rey Oaks, Marina, Seaside, Sand City, and the former military installation at Fort Ord.

Wendy Root Askew currently holds the seat for 4th District Supervisor. Her current term expires in December 2024.

District 5
The 5th District is geographically the largest of the five supervisorial districts, and covers most of the Monterey Peninsula and southern coastline of Monterey County down to the southern county border with San Luis Obispo County. The 5th District includes the cities of Carmel-by-the-Sea, Monterey, and Pacific Grove; the unincorporated communities of Carmel Valley, Big Sur, Pebble Beach, San Benancio, Corral de Tierra, and Jamesburg; military installations at the Presidio of Monterey, the Defense Language Institute, and the Naval Postgraduate School; and the Ventana Wilderness area of the Los Padres National Forest.

Mary L. Adams is currently the 5th District Supervisor. Her current term expires in December 2020.

State and federal Representatives
In the United States House of Representatives, Monterey County is split between two districts: 
 , and
 .

Policing
The Monterey County Sheriff provides court protection, jail management, and coroner service for the entire county. It provides patrol and detective services for the unincorporated areas of the county. Incorporated municipalities within the county that have their own municipal police departments are: Monterey, Pacific Grove, Salinas, King City, Marina, Seaside, Sand City, and
Gonzales.

Politics

Voter registration

Cities by population and voter registration

Overview 
For most of the 20th century, Monterey County was a Republican stronghold in presidential elections. From 1900 until 1992, the only Democrats to carry the county were Woodrow Wilson, Franklin Roosevelt, and Lyndon Johnson. Since 1992, the county has become a Democratic stronghold in Presidential and congressional elections, with George H. W. Bush in 1988 being the last Republican to win Monterey County.

According to the California Secretary of State, as of April 2008, Monterey County has 147,066 registered voters.  Of those voters, 72,550 (49.3%) are registered Democratic, 42,744 (29.1%) are registered Republican, 5,488 (3.7%) are registered with other political parties, and 26,284 (17.9%) declined to state a political party.  Except for Sand City, all of the other cities, towns, and the unincorporated area of Monterey County have more individuals registered with the Democratic Party than the Republican Party.  In Sand City, the Republicans have the advantage by 1 voter.

In August 2018, it adopted a flag designed by a Nob Hill resident.

Crime 

The following table includes the number of incidents reported and the rate per 1,000 persons for each type of offense.

Cities by population and crime rates

Media

Television service for the community comes from the Monterey-Salinas-Santa Cruz designated market area (DMA). Radio stations Monterey-Salinas-Santa Cruz area of dominant influence (ADI) or continuous measurement market (CMM). Local newspapers include the Monterey County Herald, Monterey County Weekly, Salinas Californian and the Carmel Pine Cone.

Home prices
As of December 2005, Monterey County ranked among America's ten most expensive counties, with Santa Barbara County topping the list with a median home price of $753,790. In Monterey County, the median home price was $699,900. In the northern, more densely populated part in the county, the median home price was even higher, at $712,500, making it the fourth most expensive housing market in California. The disparity between the median household income of roughly $48,305 and the median home price of $700k has been cause for recent concern over excluding potential home buyers from the market. The end of the United States housing bubble has caused prices to drop substantially, with median home prices having fallen to $280,000 as at September 2008.

Transportation

Major highways
 U.S. Route 101
 State Route 1
 State Route 68
 State Route 146
 State Route 156
 State Route 183
 State Route 198

Public transportation
Monterey County is served by Amtrak trains and Greyhound Lines buses.
Monterey-Salinas Transit provides transit service throughout most of Monterey County, with buses to Big Sur and King City as well as in Monterey, Salinas and Carmel. MST also runs service to San Jose, California in Santa Clara County

Airports
Monterey Regional Airport is located just east of the city of Monterey, California. Commercial flights are available.
Marina Municipal Airport is located in the city of Marina, California.
Salinas Municipal Airport is located in the southeast part of Salinas, California.
Mesa Del Rey Airport is located in the city of King City, California.

Communities

Cities

Carmel-by-the-Sea
Del Rey Oaks
Gonzales
Greenfield
King City
Marina
Monterey
Pacific Grove
Salinas (county seat)
Sand City
Seaside
Soledad

Census-designated places

Aromas
Boronda
Bradley
Carmel Valley Village
Castroville
Chualar
Del Monte Forest, includes the well-known community of Pebble Beach
Elkhorn
Fort Hunter Liggett
Las Lomas
Lockwood
Moss Landing
Pajaro
Pine Canyon
Prunedale
San Ardo
San Lucas
Spreckels

Unincorporated communities

 Ambler Park
 Big Sur Village
 Bryson
 Carmel Highlands
 Carmel Valley
 Corral de Tierra
 Gorda
 Jamesburg
 Jolon
 Notleys Landing
 Old Hilltown
 Pacific Grove Acres
 Parkfield
 Plaskett
 Posts
 Robles del Rio
 San Benancio
 Santa Lucia Preserve
 Slates Hot Springs
 Springtown
 Sycamore Flat
 Tassajara Hot Springs
 White Rock

Other places
Big Sur
Laguna Seca Ranch
Fort Ord Military Base decommissioned in the 1990s, some of it was converted to California State University, Monterey Bay
Naval Postgraduate School
Fort Hunter Liggett
Presidio of Monterey, home to the Defense Language Institute and one of three presidios in California
Jacks Peak Park, including the highest point on the Monterey Peninsula

Population ranking
The population ranking of the following table is based on the 2020 census of Monterey County.

† county seat

Education
School districts include:

Unified:

 Aromas-San Juan Unified School District
 Big Sur Unified School District
 Gonzales Unified School District - It serves grades PK-12 in some sections and grades 9-12 only in other sections
 Carmel Unified School District
 Coalinga-Huron Unified School District
 Monterey Peninsula Unified School District
 North Monterey County Unified School District
 Pacific Grove Unified School District
 Pajaro Valley Joint Unified School District
 Shandon Joint Unified School District
 Soledad Unified School District

Secondary:
 Paso Robles Joint Unified School District (While it is a K-12 unified school district, it only serves grades 9-12 in its section of this county)
 Salinas Union High School District
 South Monterey County Joint Union High School District

Elementary:

 Alisal Union Elementary School District
 Bradley Union Elementary School District
 Chualar Union Elementary School District
 Graves Elementary School District
 Greenfield Union Elementary School District
 King City Union Elementary School District
 Lagunita Elementary School District
 Mission Union Elementary School District
 Pleasant Valley Joint Union Elementary School District
 Salinas City Elementary School District
 San Antonio Union Elementary School District
 San Ardo Union Elementary School District
 San Lucas Union Elementary School District
 San Miguel Joint Union Elementary School District
 Santa Rita Union Elementary School District
 Spreckels Union Elementary School District
 Washington Union Elementary School District

Gallery

See also 

Coastal California
List of museums in the California Central Coast
List of school districts in Monterey County, California
Monterey County reforestation
National Register of Historic Places listings in Monterey County, California
List of tourist attractions in Monterey County, California
Fort Hunter Liggett

Notes

References

External links

 
Monterey County Convention & Visitors Bureau
Carmel Magazine: The Lifestyle Magazine of the Monterey Peninsula
Finding Aid to the Monterey County Miscellany, 1844-1850 at The Bancroft Library
Arts Council for Monterey County

 
California counties
1850 establishments in California
Populated places established in 1850
Majority-minority counties in California